Aspergillus neoauricomus is a species of fungus in the genus Aspergillus. In 2016, the genome of A. neoauricomus was sequenced as a part of the Aspergillus whole-genome sequencing project - a project dedicated to performing whole-genome sequencing of all members of the genus Aspergillus. The genome assembly size was 36.86 Mbp.

Growth and morphology

Aspergillus neoauricomus has been cultivated on both Czapek yeast extract agar (CYA) plates and Malt Extract Agar Oxoid® (MEAOX) plates. The growth morphology of the colonies can be seen in the pictures below.

References 

neoauricomus
Fungi described in 2016